Unincorporated community in Motley County, Texas, United States
Flomot is an unincorporated community in Motley County, Texas, United States. According to the Handbook of Texas, the community had an estimated population of 181 in 2000.

Geography
Flomot is located at  (34.2270137, -100.9890346). It is situated at the junction of Farm Roads 97 and 599 in northeastern Motley County, between the North Pease River and Quitaque Creek. The community lies approximately 14 miles south of Quitaque and 106 miles southeast of Amarillo.

History
The name is a portmanteau of two counties, Floyd and Motley, as the original post office – built in 1902 – was located on the county line. By that time, a school and store had already been established at the site. In 1915, the post office was moved to the residence of W.R. Welch. By the mid-1930s, Flomot had two cotton gins, two grocery stores, several restaurants, and a service station. The population peaked at around 200 in 1940. Thereafter, the community began losing businesses and residents to larger cities. The number of inhabitants had declined to 181 by 1980 and remained at that level through 2000.

Flomot has a post office with the ZIP code 79234. The Flomot Post Office closed on October 31, 2017.

Hometown of football star The Flomot Flash, Thayne "Red" Amonett. He was recruited by Coach Pete Cawthon and joined the Texas Tech Red Raiders in 1940. 

After returning from World War II he joined Coach Cawthon and the Detroit Lions.

Education
Public education in the community of Flomot is provided by the Motley County Independent School District.

Climate
According to the Köppen Climate Classification system, Flomot has a semi-arid climate, abbreviated "BSk" on climate maps.

See also
Whiteflat, Texas
Llano Estacado

References

External links

Unincorporated communities in Motley County, Texas
Unincorporated communities in Texas